The 1992 Campeonato Argentino de Rugby   was won by the Tucumàn who gained their title after the defeat of Córdoba.
The 19 teams were divided in the championship;
"Campeonato", "Ascenso", "Classificacion".

That year in Argentine rugby

National 
 The "Campeonato Juvenil" (Under 19 championship) was won by Buenos Aires
 The "Torneo de la URBA" (Buenos Aires) was won by Asociación Alumni
 The "Cordoba Province Championship" was won by Córdoba Athletic Club
 The North-East Championship was won by Tucumán Rugby Club

International 
 France rugby union team toured Argentina in Argentina. France won both the official test match against the Pumas.

 The "Pumas" toured Europe in October and November, and won all three test-matches played, against Spain., Romania and France

"Campeonato" tournament 
The better eight teams played for title. They were divided in two pools of four, the first two from each pools admitted to semifinals, the last relegated in secondo division

Pool "A"

Pool "B" 

Relegated: Entre Rios

Semifinals

Third place final

Final

"Ascenso" Tournament

Pool C

Pool D

"Classification" Tournament

References

External links 
 Memorias de la UAR 1992
  Francesco Volpe, Paolo Pacitti (Author), Rugby 2000, GTE Gruppo Editorale (1999)

Campeonato Argentino de Rugby
Argentina
Rugby